Store bededag, translated literally as Great Prayer Day or more loosely as General Prayer Day, "All Prayers" Day, Great Day of Prayers or Common Prayer Day, is a Danish holiday celebrated on the 4th Friday after Easter. It is also celebrated in the Faroe Islands, where it is called dýri biðidagur, and in Greenland.

Overview

Store bededag is a collection of minor Christian holy days consolidated into one day.  The day was introduced in the Church of Denmark in 1686 by King Christian V as a consolidation of several minor (or local) Roman Catholic holidays that had survived the Reformation of the national church. Store bededag is a statutory holiday in Denmark.  It was one of the few holidays that survived in the great holiday reform that was carried out in 1771 during the reign of Christian VII, when his Prime Minister, Count Johann Friedrich von Struensee, was in power.  The day was introduced as a more efficient alternative to individually celebrating a number of holidays honoring various minor saints in the Spring. It was not, however, Struensee who had come up with the idea of this particular reform, as the church commission which had worked on it had been instituted several years before Struensee arrived at the Danish court.

Bells in every church announce the eve of store bededag.

There are very few traditions associated with store bededag.  Formerly, citizens and students of Copenhagen strolled the city ramparts on the evening before the holiday; the students of Copenhagen University did this to honour the many students who had died defending Copenhagen during the assault on Copenhagen.  In the evening before the holiday, it was customary to buy and eat varme hveder, a traditional bread, because bakers were closed on holidays and people bought bread for the following day.

Today, the city ramparts are gone and instead the tradition is to walk along Langelinie on Copenhagen's waterfront or on the fortification of Kastellet, though only few follow this tradition depending on the spring weather. It is more common, also outside Copenhagen, to still buy and eat varme hveder.

This and Kristi himmelfartsdag (Ascension Thursday) are the only two days, other than Saturdays and Sundays, on which confirmations take place, for confirmation is part of regular church services.

The earliest possible day is 17 April (if Easter falls on 22 March), the latest possible day is 21 May (if Easter falls on 25 April).

Elimination in 2023

On 14 December 2022 Prime Minister Mette Frederiksen proposed eliminating the holiday in 2024 as a means of increasing Denmark's defence spending. The proposal did not include removing the holiday from the Faroes and Greenland. This proposal was met with a very negative reception from the opposition parties, trade unions, the national church, and the general public, with a petition to keep the holiday receiving more than 477,000 signatures as of 28 February.

On 28 February 2023, the Danish Parliament voted to abolish Store Bededag, effective from 2024.

Note

References

Sources
Danish Ministry of Foreign Affairs

External links
Great Prayer Day

Holidays based on the date of Easter
Protestant holy days
Public holidays in Denmark
April observances
May observances
Friday observances
2023 controversies
1686 establishments